La mort en ce jardin ("Death in the Garden") is a 1956 adventure film by director Luis Buñuel, based on a novel by José-André Lacour, that stars Simone Signoret, Charles Vanel and Michel Piccoli, with additional dialogue by Raymond Queneau. Set in an unidentified South American country, it recounts the bloody suppression by the corrupt governing regime of an insurrection by illegal diamond miners, after which five disparate fugitives take to the jungle in search of safety.

Plot
When a settlement of illegal diamond miners is broken up by soldiers, in revenge they attack and burn down the army headquarters in the nearest town. Next day, when reinforcements arrive, most of the surviving miners are rounded up to be shot. On a river boat, five people escape the carnage: a pacifist miner, his deaf-mute daughter, the local madame he wants to marry, a Catholic priest, and a wanted adventurer. When pursued by the army, they take to the jungle. There, the struggle for survival starts eroding their identities and in most cases their will to live. The adventurer becomes the resourceful leader, while the miner goes out of his mind and kills both the madame and the priest. After killing the miner, only the adventurer and the girl are left to find freedom together.

Cast
 Simone Signoret - Djin, the madame
 Charles Vanel - Castin, the miner
 Georges Marchal - Shark, the adventurer
 Michel Piccoli - Father Lizardi, the priest
 Michèle Girardon - María Castin, the deaf-mute
 Tito Junco - Chenko
 Raúl Ramírez - Álvaro (as Raul Ramirez)
 Luis Aceves Castañeda - Alberto (as Luis-Aceves Castañeda)
 Jorge Martínez de Hoyos - Captain Ferrero (as Jorge Martinez de Hoyos)
 Alberto Pedret - Second Lieutenant Jiménez
 Marc Lambert - Miner
 Stefani - Miner

Analysis 
Death in the Garden proposes a sort of psychological mirror-image of Franco's Spain from which Buñuel exiled himself, with rebellions and oppressors galore.

References

External links
 
Death in the Garden at Eurochannel

1956 films
1950s adventure drama films
1950s French-language films
French adventure drama films
Films about capital punishment
Films directed by Luis Buñuel
Films set in South America
Films set in jungles
Films about mining
Mexican adventure drama films
1956 drama films
1950s French films
1950s Mexican films